Rashaad Armein Penny (born February 2, 1996) is an American football running back for the Philadelphia Eagles of the National Football League (NFL). He played college football at San Diego State, where, in 2017, he led the nation with 2,248 rushing yards and scored 23 touchdowns on 289 carries, finishing fifth in the Heisman Trophy voting and garnering first-team All-American and All-Mountain West honors. Penny also caught 19 passes for 135 yards and two scores and scored twice on kickoff returns, averaging 30.6 yards on 17 attempts (ranked fifth in the FBS). He also scored a 70-yard touchdown on one of his two punt returns for the year.

Early years
Penny attended and played high school football at Norwalk High School. He had a very productive senior season as he rushed for 2,504 yards and 41 rushing touchdowns on 216 carries and caught 21 passes for 665 receiving yards and 10 receiving touchdowns. He committed to play college football at SDSU over offers from Boise State, Colorado State, Fresno State, Nevada, San Jose State, and Utah State.

College career
Penny played college football for the San Diego State Aztecs from 2014 to 2017. During the 2016 season, Penny rushed for 1,018 yards on 136 carries for an average of 7.5 yards per carry.

As a senior in 2017, Penny rushed for 216 yards and 12.0 yards per carry against Arizona State and 175 yards and 5.5 yards per carry against Stanford.  On September 25, 2017, he received the Mountain West Conference Offensive Player of the Week award for the fourth consecutive week. During the 2017 regular season, he ranked first among all Division I FBS players with 2,027 rushing yards.

College statistics

Professional career

Seattle Seahawks

2018
Penny was drafted by the Seattle Seahawks with the 27th overall pick in the first round of the 2018 NFL Draft. On May 16, 2018, Penny signed a four-year deal worth $10.7 million featuring a $5.9 million signing bonus. He made his NFL debut in the Seahawks' 27–24 loss to the Denver Broncos in the season opener. He had seven carries for eight yards to go along with four receptions for 35 yards. In a Week 10 loss to the Los Angeles Rams, Penny had a breakout game with 12 carries for 108 yards and a touchdown. Overall, he finished his rookie season with 419 rushing yards and two rushing touchdowns. The Seahawks made the playoffs as the #5-seed and faced off against the Dallas Cowboys in the Wild Card Round. In the 24–22 loss, Penny had four carries for 29 rushing yards.

2019
In Week 2 against the Pittsburgh Steelers, Penny rushed 10 times for 62 yards and his first rushing touchdown of the season as the Seahawks won 28–26.  During Week 12 against the Philadelphia Eagles, Penny finished with 129 rushing yards and a touchdown as the Seahawks won 17–9. In Week 13 against the Minnesota Vikings on Monday Night Football, Penny rushed 15 times for 74 yards and a touchdown and caught four passes for 33 yards and a touchdown in the 37–30 win.  In Week 14, Penny suffered a torn ACL and was ruled out the rest of the season. Overall, in the 2019 season, Penny appeared in ten games and recorded 370 rushing yards and three rushing touchdowns to go along with eight receptions for 83 receiving yards and one receiving touchdown.

2020
Penny was placed on the active/physically unable to perform list (PUP) at the start of training camp on August 3, 2020. He was moved to the reserve/PUP list at the start of the regular season on September 5, 2020. Penny was activated from the PUP list into the active roster on December 19, 2020.

2021
The Seahawks declined to exercise the fifth-year option on Penny's contract on May 3, 2021, making him a free agent after the 2021 season. He was placed on injured reserve on October 2, 2021. He was activated on October 25, 2021. In Week 14 Penny had a breakout game rushing 16 times for 137 Yards and 2 touchdowns in a 33-13 win over the Houston Texans. In Week 16 Penny ran for 135 yards in the 25-24 loss to the Chicago Bears. In Week 17 Penny ran for 170 yards on 25 carries along with 2 touchdowns in a 51-29 win against the Detroit Lions, continuing his breakout set of games. In week 18 Penny rushed for a career-best 190 yards on 23 carries along with a rushing touchdown during an upset win over the Arizona Cardinals. Overall Penny played in 10 games rushing for 749 yards on 119 attempts, and six touchdowns, all career highs.

2022
The Seahawks re-signed Penny on a one-year deal worth $5.7 million on March 20, 2022.

In Week 5, Penny suffered a season-ending broken fibula in the 32-39 loss against the New Orleans Saints. He was placed on injured reserve on October 14, 2022.

Philadelphia Eagles
On March 15, 2023, Penny signed a one-year contract with the Philadelphia Eagles.

Personal life
Penny has four siblings: Robert Jr., Elijhaa, Breonna, and Brionne. His parents are Desiree and Robert Penny. Penny's older brother Elijhaa is a retired NFL fullback.

References

External links
 San Diego State Aztecs bio
 
 Seattle Seahawks bio

1996 births
Living people
All-American college football players
American football running backs
People from Norwalk, California
Philadelphia Eagles players
Players of American football from California
San Diego State Aztecs football players
Seattle Seahawks players
Sportspeople from Los Angeles County, California